The Berwick Area School District is a midsized, rural, public school district. In Columbia County it covers the Boroughs of Berwick and Briar Creek and Briar Creek Township. In Luzerne County it covers the Borough of Nescopeck and Hollenback Township, Nescopeck Township and Salem Township. According to 2000 federal census data, it served a resident population of 22,622. By 2010, the district's population had declined to 22,332 people. The educational attainment levels for the school district population (25 years old and over) were 82.1% high school graduates and 13.7% college graduates. The district is one of the 500 public school districts of Pennsylvania.

According to the Pennsylvania Budget and Policy Center, 49.8% of the Berwick Area School District's pupils lived at 185% or below the Federal Poverty level as shown by their eligibility for the federal free or reduced price school meal programs in 2012. The per capita income of residents was $16,041 in 2009, while the median family income was $37,684 a year. In the Commonwealth of Pennsylvania, the median family income was $49,501, while the United States median family income was $49,445, in 2010. In Columbia County, the median household income was $42,788. By 2013, the median household income in the United States rose to $52,100.

According to District officials, in school year 2007-08, Berwick Area School District provided basic educational services to 3,176 pupils. It employed: 257 teachers, 300 full-time and part-time support personnel, and 16 administrators According to Berwick Area School District officials, the district provided basic educational services to 3,514 pupils in 2009-10. It employed: 252 teachers, 317 full-time and part-time support personnel, and increased to 17 administrators. Berwick Area School District received $19.7 million in state funding in the 2009-10 school year. Enrollment in the district declined to 3,075 in 2011-12. It employed: 240 teachers, 282 full-time and part-time support personnel, and 15 administrators. The district received $22.6 million in state funding in the 2011-12 school year.

Berwick Area School District operates six schools: Berwick Area Senior High School, Berwick Middle School, Salem Elementary School, Orange Street Elementary School, 14th Street Elementary School and Nescopeck Elementary School.

Extracurriculars
Berwick Area School District offers a variety of clubs, activities and interscholastic athletics. Berwick is the only public school district in Columbia County that does not participate in the Pennsylvania Heartland Athletic Conference.

Sports
The district funds:

Boys
Baseball - AAA
Basketball- AAA
Bowling - AAAA
Cross Country -  AA
Football - AAA
Golf -AAA
Rifle - AAAA
Soccer - AA
Swimming and Diving - AA
Tennis - AA
Track and Field - AAA
Volleyball -  AA
Wrestling - AAA

Girls
Basketball - AAA
Bowling - AAAA
Cheer - AAAA (added 2014)
Cross Country - AA
Field Hockey - AA
Golf - AAA
Rifle - AAAA
Soccer (Fall) - AA
Softball - AAA
Swimming and Diving - AA (added 2014)
Girls' Tennis - AA
Track and Field - AAA
Volleyball -  AA

Middle School Sports

Boys
Baseball
Basketball
Cross Country
Football
Soccer
Track and Field
Wrestling	

Girls
Basketball
Cheer
Cross Country
Field Hockey
Soccer (fall)
Softball
Track and Field

According to PIAA directory July 2012

References

School districts in Columbia County, Pennsylvania
School districts in Luzerne County, Pennsylvania
fix infobox